The 2020 Maldives FA Cup was the 30th edition of the Maldives FA Cup, the top-tier knockout football tournament in Maldives organized by the Football Association of Maldives. The tournament returns after two years of absence. A total of eight teams compete in the tournament.

All times local, MVT (UTC+5).

Quarter-finals

Semi-finals
All football activities in Maldives were suspended indefinitely by the Football Association of Maldives due to COVID-19. Later it was decided the tournament would be cancelled and declared null and void.

Final

See also
2019–20 Dhivehi Premier League

References

External links
FAM - FA Cup at Facebook

Maldives FA Cup seasons
FA Cup
2020 Asian domestic association football cups
Maldives FA Cup